The following is a list of state-level chief justices in the United States:

References 

Government occupations
Positions of authority
Legal professions